Project Runway Season 18 began Thursday, December 5, 2019. Sixteen designers compete to become "the next great American designer." Returning as judges are supermodel Karlie Kloss, editor-in-chief of Elle, Nina Garcia, fashion designer Brandon Maxwell, and former editor-in-chief of Teen Vogue Elaine Welteroth. Season 4 winner Christian Siriano returns to mentor the designers and use the "Siriano save" for the first time to bring an eliminated designer back into the competition if he disagrees with the judge’s verdict. A "save" was also used by Tim Gunn beginning in Season 12 and continuing for the remainder of his time with the show.

Designers
Source: Entertainment Weekly

Designer Progress

 Asma and Jenn, the losing pair, were eliminated, as the judges had a hard time deciding who should have been out.

 Due to health issues, Dayoung withdrew from the competition, sparing Marquise from his elimination.

 Christian Siriano decided to save Brittany from elimination, using the Siriano Save.

 On Episode 11, No one was eliminated as the judges felt that everyone did a good job. Because of the non-elimination, it was revealed that Episode 12 would be a Double Elimination round.

 The designer won Project Runway Season 18.
 The designer advanced to the Finale.
 The designer won the challenge.
 The designer was in the top two. 
 The designer had one of the highest scores but did not win.
 The designer had one of the lowest scores but was not eliminated.
 The designer was in the bottom two. 
 The designer was eliminated from the competition.
 The designer lost, but was saved from elimination by Christian Siriano using the "Siriano Save".
 The designer withdrew due to health reasons.

Model Progress

 Alan Gonzalez - AG
 Asma Bibi - AB
 Brittany Allen - BA
 Chelsey Carter - CC
 Dayoung Kim - DK
 Delvin McCray - DM
 Geoffrey Mac - GM
 Jenn Charkow - JC
 Marquise Foster - MF
 Melanie Trygg - MT
 Nancy Volpe-Berringer - NB
 Sergio Guadarrama - SG
 Shavi Lewis - SL
 Tyler Neasloney - TN
 Veronica Sheaffer - VS
 Victoria Cocieru - VC

Episodes

Episode 1: Blast Off 
Original airdate: 

With luggage still in tow, the designers are greeted at the TWA Hotel at John F. Kennedy International Airport ready to take flight with their first challenge: to create an innovative look inspired by humanity's continued push into space exploration. The designers must pair up and collaborate to make two cohesive pieces -- a jumpsuit and a cocktail look -- that blow away the judges. 

 WINNER: Brittany Allen
 ELIMINATED: Jenn Charkow & Asma Bibi

Episode 2: Cats of the Urban Jungle
Original airdate: 

Designers must create a fresh take on a timeless classic: animal prints;. Taking inspiration from the movie Cats, the designers must tame their prints to create cool street-style looks that compete on the runway and in the Flash Sale challenge.

 Guest Judge: Marni Senofonte
 WINNER: Marquise Foster
 ELIMINATED: Veronica Sheaffer

Episode 3: Sleigh the Runway
Original airdate: 

The designers are awakened by a surprise visitor and are challenged to show their holiday spirit in the perfect party dress. They are given two days to create the look using holiday-themed unconventional materials.

 Guest Judge: Kiernan Shipka
 WINNER: Sergio Guadarrama
 ELIMINATED: Alan Gonzalez

Episode 4: The Ultimate Upcycle
Original airdate: 

Guest mentor and celebrity stylist Karla Welch tasks the designers with dressing Karlie Kloss, her client. The designers must use donated clothing from a Goodwill store to create their looks for this one-day challenge.

 Guest Judge: Laverne Cox
 WINNER: Victoria Cocieru
 ELIMINATED: Tyler Neasloney

Episode 5: She's Sew Unusual
Original airdate: 

Singer Cyndi Lauper inspires and guest judges this team challenge. The designers must create cohesive mini-collections paying homage to Lauper's 1980s fashion style while still giving the looks a modern take -- but Christian throws out a mid-challenge twist that changes everything. 

 Guest Judge: Cyndi Lauper
 Winning team: Team Chaos
 WINNER: Geoffrey Mac
 ELIMINATED: Melanie Trygg

Episode 6: There Is Only One You
Original airdate: 

The designers are given a chance to think about their family history and channel those stories and emotions into a look of their choosing. The stakes are high in this one-day, Flash Sale challenge.

 Guest Judge: Fernando Garcia
 WINNER: Chelsey Carter
 ELIMINATED: Shavi Lewis

Episode 7: Project Runway X Ashley Longshore 
Original airdate: January 23, 2020

The designers are challenged to collaborate with the fashion industry's latest art darling, Ashley Longshore. Using her pop art prints for their garments, the designers must create bold looks that celebrate these one-of-a-kind prints.

 Guest Judge: Ashley Longshore
 WINNER: Brittany Allen
 ELIMINATED: Marquise Foster

Episode 8: Sheer Genius 
Original airdate: January 30, 2020

The designers are faced with their hardest challenge yet: a one-day challenge using difficult-to-use sexy, sheer fabrics to create editorial looks. 

Note: Dayoung Kim withdrew for health reasons. Most recently eliminated designer Marquise Foster returned to the competition.

 Guest Judge: Paloma Elsesser
 WINNER: Sergio Guadarrama    
 ELIMINATED: Chelsey Carter   
 WITHDREW: Dayoung Kim

Episode 9: Suit Yourself 
Original airdate: February 6, 2020

The challenge is all about turning the tuxedo on its head; inspired by Christian Siriano's Oscar look for actor Billy Porter, the designers must find a way to take the tuxedo into the future with a mix of male, female and non-binary models. A perfectly tailored suit is nearly impossible without help, so the designers get a surprise second set of hands to help out. 

 Guest Judge: Thom Browne
 WINNER: Marquise Foster
 SIRIANO SAVE: Brittany Allen

Episode 10: Live and Let Tie Dye 
Original airdate: February 13, 2020

Tie dye is back in a big way, and the designers will need to create their own textiles to elevate the trend from casual to couture. In a twist that may feel more like a trick to the designers, it's an overnight challenge. 

 Guest Judge: Leslie Jones
 WINNER:   Geoffrey Mac
 ELIMINATED: Delvin McCray

Episode 11: Olympic Game Plan 
Original airdate: February 20, 2020

The designers are paired up with athletes who will be competing to be in the 2020 Summer Olympic and Paralympic games. The designers need to make them their dream outfit for a victory night celebration, using all of their specialty skills to make the perfect proportions for their client's unique bodies, all while keeping their own point of view during a tough client challenge.

Guest Judge: Lindsey Vonn
 WINNER:   Nancy Volpe-Beringer
 ELIMINATED: None

Episode 12: The Height of Avant Garde Fashion 
Original airdate: February 27, 2020

With only one challenge left to make it to New York Fashion Week, the remaining designers must think big to create an avant-garde look that is anything but ordinary. In a fashion first, the runway begins with a season long retrospective, outside and 16 stories high, at New York City’s dramatic Vessel. The stakes are as high as the runway, because in fashion one day you’re in, and in this challenge, two will be out. 

Guest Judge: Rachel Brosnahan
ELIMINATED: Brittany Allen & Marquise Foster

Episode 13: Finale Part 1 
Original airdate: March 5, 2020

Christian visits the remaining contestants at home as they furiously complete their final collections. Then it's back to workroom to refine and revise, because even though New York Fashion Week is here, that doesn't mean everyone will show in the finale. 

Note: The episode ends with a cliffhanger, the next episode will announce who will officially go through to the New York Fashion Week.
Guest Judge: Steven Kolb
ELIMINATED: None (announced in Episode 14)

Episode 14: Finale Part 2 
Original airdate: March 12, 2020

The remaining designers rush to put the final touches on their collections, balancing advice from experts while trying to not lose their own point of view. It’s game, set, match when Serena Williams joins as guest judge for the final runway, with only one designer chosen as the winner.

Guest Judge: Serena Williams
WINNER of Project Runway: Geoffrey Mac
 ELIMINATED: Nancy Volpe-Beringer & Sergio Guadarrama & Victoria Cocieru

Notes

References

External links 

Season 18
2019 American television seasons
2020 American television seasons
2019 in fashion